Rashad Muhammed (born 25 September 1993) is a French professional footballer who plays as a winger for Turkish club Ankara Keçiörengücü.

Career
Muhammed is a youth product of Paris Saint-Germain F.C. and began his footballing career in semi-pro leagues in Belgium. After years of issues with agents, injuries, and unpaid wages, Muhammed took a year away from football before moving to Norway with Florø. He then moved to Sarpsborg 08 where he managed to play in the Europa League. On 14 January 2019, Muhammed signed a contract with Erzurum BB in the Turkish Süper Lig.

Career statistics

References

External links
Profile for Sarpsborg 08

1993 births
Sportspeople from Saint-Germain-en-Laye
Footballers from Yvelines
French footballers
Living people
Association football wingers
Union Royale Namur Fosses-La-Ville players
Sarpsborg 08 FF players
Florø SK players
Erzurumspor footballers
Ankara Keçiörengücü S.K. footballers
Eliteserien players
Süper Lig players
TFF First League players
French expatriate footballers
French expatriate sportspeople in Belgium
French expatriate sportspeople in Norway
French expatriate sportspeople in Turkey
Expatriate footballers in Belgium
Expatriate footballers in Norway
Expatriate footballers in Turkey